Wild Card (also known as Zoe Busiek: Wild Card) is a comedy-drama series starring Joely Fisher. It was broadcast in the United States on Lifetime, and on the Global Television Network in Canada from August 2003 to July 2005.

Synopsis
Zoe Busiek is a former Las Vegas blackjack dealer whose life takes an unexpected turn when her sister dies in a car accident and she has to take care of her sister's three children, teenaged Taylor, preteen Cliff, and little kid Hannah. When the insurance company denies the family a financial settlement Zoe takes matters into her own hands, which leads her to a new career as an insurance fraud investigator with handsome former criminal Dan Lennox and serious but sweet Sophia Mason becoming her partners.

Each episode is centered on a particular case as well as Zoe's family life.

Sophia later becomes the boss. She leaves the show in the second season, along with Marcos, and is replaced by M. Pearl McGuire, who becomes Zoe's and Dan's new boss.

Cast

Main
 Joely Fisher as Zoe Busiek
 Chris Potter as Dan Lennox
 Rae Dawn Chong as Sophia Mason (season 1)
 Bronson Picket as Marcos Morales (season 1)
 Jamie Johnston as Clifford "Cliff" Woodall
 Vikki Krinsky as Taylor Woodall
 Aislinn Paul as Hannah Woodall
 Loretta Devine as M. (Matilda) Pearl McGuire (season 2)

Recurring
 Corey Sevier as Julian
 Yani Gellman as Ryder
 Joe Pingue as Leo Lombardi

Production notes
The series, which is set in Chicago, Illinois (filmed in Toronto), was created and executive produced by Lynn Marie Latham and Bernard Lechowick. The theme song for the first season is performed by Amy Sky, while the theme song for the second season, "I Believe In Me," is performed by Cherie.

Main crew
Lynn Marie Latham, Bernard Lechowick, Linda Gase, and Thania St. John. Latham and Lechowick were fired as showrunners by the end of the first season, replaced by Doug Steinberg (formerly a consultant on Dawson's Creek).

Episodes

Series overview

Season 1 (2003–04)

Season 2 (2004–05)

Syndication
The series was aired in syndication on the Lifetime Real Women network.

References
 Jeffrey Stepakoff, Billion-Dollar Kiss: The Kiss That Saved Dawson's Creek (Gotham/Penguin), p. 297. Stepakoff was briefly a co-executive producer of the series in its early episodes.

External links
 
 
 

2000s American comedy-drama television series
2003 American television series debuts
2005 American television series endings
2000s American crime television series
2000s Canadian comedy-drama television series
2003 Canadian television series debuts
2005 Canadian television series endings
2000s Canadian crime television series
English-language television shows
Global Television Network original programming
Lifetime (TV network) original programming
Television shows set in Chicago
Television shows filmed in Toronto
Television series by Corus Entertainment